Museum Nord is a Norwegian museum consortium for the northern part of Nordland county, including the districts of Lofoten, Vesterålen, and Ofoten. The museum is set up as a foundation and was established on December 13, 2002. It opened in 2004 and it is one of three museum consortia in Nordland; the other two are the Helgeland Museum and the Nordland Museum.

The museum unit has about 53 permanent employees and 13 full-time-equivalent positions through the company Lofotr Næringsdrift AS, which is wholly owned by Museum Nord. Museum Nord's administration is located at Melbu in Hadsel (staff and archives) and Borg in Vestvågøy (business and marketing). The director of the museum unit, with offices in Melbu, is Geir Are Johansen.

The museums included in Museum Nord receive 60% operating support from the state, 20% from the county, and 20% from their municipality.

Units
Museum Nord has 21 units divided in 11 municipalities. The Lofotr Viking Museum was originally a separate museum, with the same status as Museum Nord, the Nordland Museum, and the Helgeland Museum, but it was later made a unit of Museum Nord.
 The Andøy Museum (Andøymuseet) in Andøy
 The Ballangen Museum in Ballangen
 The Bø Museum in Bø
 The Coastal Express Museum in Hadsel
 The Espolin Gallery in Vågan
 The Lofoten War Memorial Museum (Lofoten Krigsminnemuseum) in Vågan
 The Lofotr Viking Museum (Lofotr Vikingmuseum) in Vestvågøy
 Museum Nord, Narvik (formerly the Ofoten Museum) in Narvik
 Museum Nord, Tysfjord (formerly the  Tysfjord Museum) in Tysfjord, with departments in Tysfjord and Korsnes
 The Norwegian Fishing Industry Museum (Norsk Fiskeindustrimuseum) in Hadsel
 The Norwegian Fishing Village Museum (Norsk Fiskeværsmuseum) in Moskenes
 The Øksnes Museum in Øksnes
 The SKREI Heritage Center (SKREI Opplevelsessenter), which includes the Lofoten Aquarium (Lofotakvariet), Espolin Gallery, and Lofoten Museum (Lofotmuseet) in Vågan. The Lofoten Museum is part of the Coastal Administration Museum (Kystverksmusea).
 The Sortland Museum in Sortland
 The Sørvågen branch of the Norwegian Telecom Museum (Telemuseet) in Moskenes
 The Vesterålen Museum (Vesterålsmuseet) in Hadsel
 The Vestvågøy Museum in Vestvågøy (The Skaftnes Farm and Fygle Museum, Skaftnes Gård & Fygle museum)

References

External links

 Museum Nord website

Museums in Nordland
Museums established in 2002